Attila Marosi (born 1 October 1982) is a Hungarian alpine skier. He competed in two events at the 2006 Winter Olympics.

References

1982 births
Living people
Hungarian male alpine skiers
Olympic alpine skiers of Hungary
Alpine skiers at the 2006 Winter Olympics
Skiers from Budapest